Bye Felicia may refer to:

 "Bye, Felicia", a two-word phrase originally from the 1995 film Friday
 #ByeFelicia, a 2014 mixtape by American singer Jordin Sparks